Eckhart Tolle (born Ulrich Leonard Tölle, February 16, 1948) is a German-born spiritual teacher and self-help author. His books include The Power of Now: A Guide to Spiritual Enlightenment (1997), A New Earth: Awakening to Your Life's Purpose (2005) and the picture book Guardians of Being (2009).

Early life

Ulrich Leonard Tölle was born in Lünen, a small town north of Dortmund in the Ruhr region of Germany in 1948.

In 1961 he moved to Spain to live with his father, where he "refused all forms of formal education between the ages of 13 and 22, preferring instead to pursue his own creative and philosophical interests". At 15, he was "heavily influenced" by a gift of the five spiritual books by the German mystic Joseph Anton Schneiderfranken.

Career
When he was 19, Tolle moved to England and taught German and Spanish for three years at a London language school. After attending the University of London, he enrolled in a postgraduate program at the University of Cambridge in 1977.

Spiritual experience
One night in 1977, at the age of 29, after having suffered from long periods of depression, Tolle says he experienced an "inner transformation". That night he awakened from his sleep, suffering from feelings of depression that were "almost unbearable," but then experienced a life-changing epiphany.  Recounting the experience, he says,  Tolle recalls going out for a walk in London the next morning, and finding that “everything was miraculous, deeply peaceful. Even the traffic." The feeling continued, and he began to feel a strong underlying sense of peace in any situation. 

He stopped studying for his doctorate, and for a period of about two years after this he spent much of his time sitting, “in a state of deep bliss," on park benches in Russell Square, Central London, "watching the world go by.” He stayed with friends, in a Buddhist monastery, or otherwise slept rough on Hampstead Heath. His family thought him “irresponsible, even insane."  He changed his first name from Ulrich to Eckhart; according to some reports this was in homage to the German philosopher and mystic, Meister Eckhart. A 2012 interview article states that he saw the name Eckhart on one of a pile of books in a dream, and knew he had written the book; soon after in real life he ran into a psychic friend who called him Eckhart out of nowhere, so he changed his name.

Career as spiritual teacher
Former Cambridge students and acquaintances began to ask Tolle about his beliefs. He started working as a counselor and spiritual teacher. Students continued to come to him over the next five years. He moved to Glastonbury, a center of alternative living. In 1995 he moved to Vancouver.

The Power of Now, Tolle's first book, was published in 1997 by Namaste Publishing. The book was republished on a large scale by New World Library in 1999.

In 2000, Oprah Winfrey recommended The Power of Now in her magazine O. In August 2000, it reached The New York Times Best Seller Advice, Miscellaneous and Hardcover list, reaching number one two years later. By 2008, the book had been translated from English into 33 languages. In July 2011, it had appeared on the list of the 10 best selling Paperback Advice & Miscellaneous books for 102 weeks.

His second book, Stillness Speaks, appeared in 2003. That year, he stated that he had no intention of creating "a heavy commercial structure", nor of setting up an ashram or centre. He believed one "could develop organically" and said "one needs to be careful that the organization doesn't become self-serving". Nevertheless, his website sells his books and "a dizzying range" of materials offering spiritual guidance, and a separate website streams video of monthly group meditations.

In 2005, Tolle published A New Earth. In January, Oprah Winfrey selected it for her book club, and high sales followed. In the four weeks following the announcement, 3.5 million copies were shipped. It was ranked number one on The New York Times Best Seller list 46 times by the end of 2008.

In 2008, Tolle partnered with Winfrey to produce a series of webinars, each one focusing on a chapter from his books, with discussions, silent meditations, and questions from viewers via Skype. The third webinar attracted more than 11 million viewers. By October 2009, the webinars had been accessed 35 million times. In 2016, Tolle was named in Winfrey's SuperSoul 100 list of visionaries and influential leaders.

In September 2009, he appeared with the Dalai Lama at the Vancouver Peace Summit. The same year, he published Guardians of Being, a picture book illustrated by Patrick McDonnell.

In 2018, Watkins Mind Body Spirit published some of Tolle's nature photography. Tolle commented that "both art and nature can serve as portals into the transcendent dimension, your essence-identity."

Reception

Popularity
By 2009, total sales of The Power of Now and A New Earth in North America were estimated at 3 million and 5 million copies respectively, and The New York Times stated that Tolle was "the most popular spiritual author" in the United States. In 2011, the Watkins Review put him at number 1 in a list of "The 100 Most Spiritually Influential Living People".

By the press and others

The books have received a wide range of praise and criticism from reviewers. In 2000, Carter Phipps wrote that "Tolle's clear writing and the obvious depth of his experience and insight set it apart". In 2003, Andrea Sachs characterized The Power of Now as "awash in spiritual mumbo-jumbo", while in 2008, an article in The New York Times stated that Tolle is "not identified with any religion, but uses teachings from Zen Buddhism, Sufism, Hinduism, and the Bible".

Some critics have characterized his books as unoriginal or derivative. James Robinson in The Observer in 2008 called his writings "a mix of pseudo-science, New Age philosophy, and teaching borrowed from established religions". A 2009 article in The New York Times stated that he is "hardly the first writer to tap into the American longing for meaning and success". Sara Nelson, the editor-in-chief of Publishers Weekly, said Tolle's writings had been successful due to surging public interest in self-help books.

Others have praised his re-working and synthesis of traditions. New Age writer William Bloom wrote that "Tolle is offering a very contemporary synthesis of Eastern spiritual teaching, which is normally so clothed in arcane language that it is incomprehensible", thereby providing "a valuable perspective on Western culture". Publisher Judith Kendra says, "The ideas [that Tolle is] talking about have been in existence for thousands of years in both Eastern texts and with the great Western mystics, but he's able to make them understandable".

By Christian theologians
In 2008, an article in The Independent noted that "Tolle's theories are certainly seen by many as profoundly non-Christian, even though Tolle often quotes from the Bible", but that "Tolle does have fans in academic, even Christian, circles". It cited Andrew Ryder, a theologian at All Hallows College in Dublin, who wrote "While he may not use the language of traditional Christian spirituality, Tolle is very much concerned that, as we make our way through the ordinary events of the day, we keep in touch with the deepest source of our being."

James Beverley, professor of Christian Thought and Ethics at the evangelical Tyndale Seminary in Toronto, says that Tolle's worldview "is at odds with central Christian convictions" and that "Tolle denies the core of Christianity by claiming there is no ultimate distinction between humans and God and Jesus". John Stackhouse, a professor of theology and culture at evangelical Regent College in Vancouver, says that Tolle "gives a certain segment of the population exactly what they want: a sort of supreme religion that purports to draw from all sorts of lesser, that is, established religions". Stackhouse has described him as one of several spiritual teachers who "purport to have investigated the world's religions (quite a claim) and found them wanting, who routinely subject those religions to withering criticism, and who then champion their own views as superior to all these alternatives".

Conversely, Stafford Betty, scholar of religion at California State University, Bakersfield, finds common ground between Tolle's worldview and that of Christian mystics. He notes that "one of the key elements in Tolle's teaching is that deep within the mind is absolute stillness in which one can experience 'the joy of Being'". Roman Catholic priest and theologian Richard Rohr credits Tolle for helping to reintroduce ancient Christian mysticism to modern Christians: "Tolle is, in fact, rather brilliantly bringing to our awareness the older tradition...both the ground and the process for breaking through to the theological contemplation of God, and acquired contemplation of Jesus, the Gospels, and all spiritual things."

In popular culture
Tolle and his teachings take a central role in Kendrick Lamar's 2022 album Mr. Morale & the Big Steppers. Throughout the album, Tolle is positioned as Lamar's spiritual teacher.

In the 2018 film Venom, the protagonist listens to a brief segment of a Tolle audiobook, but is interrupted by a neighbor's loud rock music.

Personal life
In 1995, after visiting the West Coast of North America several times, Tolle settled in Vancouver, British Columbia. There he met his wife, Kim Eng, a spiritual teacher and the creator of Presence Through Movement; she leads retreats and workshops internationally in partnership with Tolle.

Publications

Books
 The Power of Now: A Guide to Spiritual Enlightenment. Namaste, 1997. .
 Practicing the Power of Now: Essential Teachings, Meditations, and Exercises from The Power of Now. New World Library, 2001. .
 Stillness Speaks: Whispers of Now. New World Library, 2003. .
 A New Earth: Awakening to Your Life's Purpose. Dutton, 2005. .
 Oneness With All Life: Inspirational Selections from A New Earth. Penguin, 2008. .

Graphic novels
 Guardians of Being. New World Library, 2009. .

Children's books
Milton's Secret: An Adventure of Discovery through Then, When, and The Power of Now. Charlottesville, Virginia: Hampton Roads, 2008. .

References

External links

 

1948 births
Alumni of the University of London
German expatriates in Canada
German male non-fiction writers
German self-help writers
German spiritual teachers
German spiritual writers
Living people
Nautilus Book Award winners
New Age spiritual leaders
New Age writers
New Thought writers
People from Lünen